Issa bin Samir Hamed Al-Adawi (born 20 March 1999) is an Omani swimmer. He competed in the men's 100 metre freestyle at the 2020 Summer Olympics.

Al-Adawi was born in Oman to an Omani father and a Japanese mother.

References

External links
 

1999 births
Living people
Omani male swimmers
Omani male freestyle swimmers
Olympic swimmers of Oman
Swimmers at the 2020 Summer Olympics
Omani people of Japanese descent
Asian Games competitors for Oman
Swimmers at the 2014 Asian Games
Swimmers at the 2018 Asian Games